Tony Roper may refer to:

 Tony Roper (racing driver) (1964–2000), NASCAR driver
 Tony Roper (actor) (born 1941), Scottish actor, comedian, playwright and writer